Weija is a small town and is the capital of Ga South Municipal District, a district in the Greater Accra Region of Ghana. Weija has become a hotspot for economic activity because of the ultra modern shopping center, the West Hills Mall, which has been built there.

References

Populated places in the Greater Accra Region